Kely Liseth Alonzo Molina (born 29 September 1995) is a Bolivian footballer who plays as a midfielder. She has been a member of the Bolivia women's national team.

Early life
Alonzo hails from the Chuquisaca Department.

International career
Alonzo played for Bolivia at senior level in the 2014 Copa América Femenina.

References

1995 births
Living people
Women's association football midfielders
Bolivian women's footballers
People from Chuquisaca Department
Bolivia women's international footballers